Sungshin Women's University Station is a station on the Line 4 of the Seoul Subway and Ui LRT. As its name indicates, it serves the nearby Sungshin Women's University.

Station layout

Vicinity
Exit 1 : Sungshin Girls' Middle & High Schools, Mia-ri Pass
Exit 2 : Sungshin Women's University
Exit 3 : Seongbuk District Office, Donam Market
Exit 4 : Donam Elementary School
Exit 5 : Jeongdeok Elementary School, Hanshin Hyu APT
Exit 6 :
Exit 7 : Gomyeong Middle School, Mia-ri Pass

References

Seoul Metropolitan Subway stations
Railway stations in South Korea opened in 1985
Metro stations in Seongbuk District